Whitfieldia preussii is a species of plant in the family Acanthaceae. It is found in Cameroon and Equatorial Guinea. Its natural habitat is subtropical or tropical moist lowland forests. It is threatened by habitat loss.

References

Acanthaceae
Vulnerable plants
Taxonomy articles created by Polbot